Trischa Zorn (born June 1, 1964 in Orange, California) is an American Paralympic swimmer. Blind from birth, she competed in Paralympic swimming (S12, SB12, and SM12 disability categories). She is the most successful athlete in the history of the Paralympic Games, having won 55 medals (41 gold, 9 silver, and 5 bronze), and was inducted into the Paralympic Hall of Fame in 2012.  She took the Paralympic Oath for athletes at the 1996 Summer Paralympics in Atlanta.

Biography
Zorn studied special education at the University of Nebraska and school administration and supervision at Indiana University-Purdue University Indianapolis and law at the IU Robert H. McKinney School of Law.

She competed in the 1980, 1984, 1988, 1992, 1996, 2000 and 2004 Paralympic Games and won a combined total of 55 medals (41 gold, 9 silver, 5 bronze). In the 1996 Games in Atlanta, she won more medals than any other athlete: two gold, three silver and three bronze. She had also topped the individual medal table at the 1992 Paralympic Games in Barcelona, with ten gold medals and two silver. She had won seven gold medals during her first Games in 1980.

After the Sydney Games in 2000, she also held eight world records in her disability category (50 m backstroke, 100 m backstroke, 200 m backstroke, 200 m individual medley, 400 m individual medley, 200 m breaststroke, 4×50 m medley relay, 4×50 m free relay).

On 1 January 2005, Zorn was one of eight athletes honoured during New Year celebrations in Times Square in New York City. The other seven were Ian Thorpe of Australia, Nadia Comăneci of Romania, George Weah of Liberia, Françoise Mbango Etone of Cameroon, Gao Min of China, Félix Sánchez of the Dominican Republic and Bart Conner of the United States. The eight athletes were "centre stage during the festivities in the countdown leading up to ringing in the New Year". In 2012, she was inducted into the International Paralympian Hall of Fame.

Although no longer competing as a swimmer, Zorn works as a legal professional for the Department of Veterans Affairs and lives near Indianapolis, Indiana.

Paralympic medals
The medals without relay races from 1980 Summer Paralympics to 1988 Summer Paralympics, are 46 (32, 9, 5) for IPC. The relay team of United States, in the category of Zorn, won 5 gold and 1 silver in these three Paralympics. The question marks in the infobox refer however to 9 gold medals (not 5 gold and 1 silver medal), this is to confirm the total number of 55 (of which 41 gold), reported in many websites including that of the official IPC in another of his article.

See also
 Athletes with most gold medals in one sport at the Paralympic Games
 Wikinews interviews winner of 55 Paralympic medals, Trischa Zorn

References

External links

 
 

Paralympic swimmers of the United States
Swimmers at the 1980 Summer Paralympics
Swimmers at the 1984 Summer Paralympics
Swimmers at the 1988 Summer Paralympics
Swimmers at the 1992 Summer Paralympics
Swimmers at the 1996 Summer Paralympics
Swimmers at the 2000 Summer Paralympics
Swimmers at the 2004 Summer Paralympics
Paralympic gold medalists for the United States
Paralympic silver medalists for the United States
Paralympic bronze medalists for the United States
American female breaststroke swimmers
1964 births
Living people
American blind people
World record holders in paralympic swimming
Indiana University–Purdue University Indianapolis alumni
Medalists at the 1980 Summer Paralympics
Medalists at the 1984 Summer Paralympics
Medalists at the 1988 Summer Paralympics
Medalists at the 1992 Summer Paralympics
Medalists at the 1996 Summer Paralympics
Medalists at the 2000 Summer Paralympics
Medalists at the 2004 Summer Paralympics
Paralympic medalists in swimming
21st-century American women
S12-classified Paralympic swimmers